Ratoma  is an urban sub-prefecture in the Conakry Region of Guinea and one of five in the capital Conakry. As of 2014 it had a population of 653,934 people.

References

Sub-prefectures of Conakry